Lepidoblepharis nukak is a species of gecko, a lizard in the family Sphaerodactylidae. The species is endemic to Colombia.

Etymology
The specific name, nukak, is in honor of the Nukak people of Colombia.

Geographic range
L. nukak is found in Guaviare Department, Colombia.

Habitat

Description

References

Further reading
Calderon-Espinosa, Martha Lucia; Medina-Rangel, Guido Fabian (2016). "A new Lepidoblepharis lizard (Squamata: Sphaerodactylidae) from the Colombian Guyana shield". Zootaxa 4067 (2): 215–232. (Lepidoblepharis nukak, new species).

Lepidoblepharis
Reptiles described in 2016